Bidford-on-Avon is a large village and civil parish in the English county of Warwickshire, very close to the border with Worcestershire. In the 2001 census it had a population of 4,830, increasing to 5,350 at the 2011 census.

History

Ryknield Street, the Roman road, passes through the village, going north towards Alcester. There is also an ancient Anglo-Saxon burial site under the free car park located just behind the Indian restaurant "No 72". First discovered in the 1920s, artefacts from more recent excavations are located at Warwick Museum, while material from the first excavations on the site currently resides in the hands of the Shakespeare Birthplace Trust. A Bronze Age razor was found in excavations at Bidford-on-Avon. Bidford was the birthplace and childhood home of the 20th-century author Barbara Comyns.

William Shakespeare is said to have joined a party of Stratford folk which set itself to outdrink a drinking club at Bidford-on-Avon, and as a result of his labours in that regard to have fallen asleep under the crab tree of which a descendant is still called Shakespeares tree. When morning dawned his friends wished to renew the encounter but he wisely said "No I have drunk with “Piping Pebworth, Dancing Marston, Haunted Hillboro’, Hungry Grafton, Dodging Exhall, Papist Wixford, Beggarly Broom and Drunken Bidford” and so, presumably, I will drink no more." The story is said to date from the 17th century but of its truth or of any connection of the story or the verse to Shakespeare there is no evidence. The Falcon Inn was a favourite tavern in his day.

Location
The village grew up around an ancient ford (Byda's Ford), now replaced by a narrow stone bridge, on the Ryknild Street Roman road, now a minor country road to Honeybourne  to the south. It also lies on the Heart of England Way.

Local government
Bidford-on-Avon is a civil parish with an elected parish council. It falls within the areas of Stratford-on-Avon District Council and Warwickshire County Council. The three councils are responsible for different aspects of local government. Besides the village of Bidford itself, the civil parish includes the settlements of Barton, Broom and Marlcliff. Broom lies to the north of Bidford, whilst both Barton and Marlcliff lie south of the river.

Bidford Community Library 
When Warwickshire County Council took the decision to close the Bidford Library in April 2012, a Social Enterprise company was formed. The Library officially reopened on 2 May 2012, by children's author Anne Fine. The library was fully refurbished in Spring 2018, thanks to funding provided by a Section 106 Planning Obligation.

Transport

The river is crossed by Bidford Bridge, which is a scheduled monument. During the week beginning on Monday 26 November 2012, the Bridge had to be closed due to flooding, when the River Avon burst its banks, in various places. On 9 June 2015, the bridge was closed to traffic after a heavy duty farm vehicle crashed into it, causing serious damage to the historic structure. Police cars were positioned either side of the bridge to alert drivers to the fact that the bridge was inaccessible to traffic. After repairs, the bridge has now re-opened.

The Broom to Stratford section (including  and also ), was an early casualty, with passenger services suspended in June 1947 and closure rubber-stamped as permanent in May 1949. The line itself remained open with the south curve of Broom Junction until at least 1952. Today the closest station to Bidford, is Honeybourne railway station, which is located 5 miles south of the village. Honeybourne station provides regular rail services to London Paddington,  and  along the Cotswold Line.

Churches
The Anglican parish church is dedicated to St. Laurence. St. Joseph the Worker Church is the local Roman Catholic church. The Barn is the home of Bidford Baptist Church. Bidford also has a Methodist church.

Twinning village

Bidford is twinned with Ebsdorfergrund, a village close to Marburg in Rheinhessen, Germany.

Notable people
 

Fred Wilkes (1883-1942), professional footballer

References

External links

 Parish council website
 www.geograph.co.uk : photos of Bidford-on-Avon and surrounding area

 
Villages in Warwickshire
Civil parishes in Warwickshire
Stratford-on-Avon District